Ivan Radovanović (born 29 August 1988) is a Serbian professional footballer who plays as a defensive midfielder.

At international level, Radovanović earned ten caps for Serbia between 2010 and 2013.

Club career
After coming through the youth system at Partizan, Radovanović was promoted to the senior squad in the 2006–07 season, collecting two cup appearances in the process. He was subsequently loaned to fellow Serbian SuperLiga club Smederevo in the summer of 2007.

In January 2008, Radovanović was transferred to Italian club Atalanta. He failed to make his Serie A debut through the remainder of the 2007–08 season, being an unused sub in five games. While at Atalanta, Radovanović was also sent on loan to Pisa, Bologna, and Novara.

In July 2013, Radovanović switched to fellow Italian club Chievo. He appeared in more than 180 official games over the course of five and a half seasons. On 31 January 2019, Radovanović moved to Genoa.

On 31 January 2022, Radovanović signed with Salernitana until 2023. His contract with Salernitana was terminated by mutual consent on 8 February 2023.

International career
Radovanović represented Serbia at the 2007 UEFA European Under-19 Championship in July 2007. He subsequently made his debuts for the under-21 side at the Valeriy Lobanovskyi Memorial Tournament in August 2007, where Serbia won silver medals.

On 17 November 2010, Radovanović made his full international debut for Serbia in a 1–0 away friendly win against Bulgaria, coming on as a half-time substitute for Radosav Petrović.

Career statistics

Club

International

Notes

References

External links

 
 
 

A.C. ChievoVerona players
Pisa S.C. players
Association football midfielders
Atalanta B.C. players
Bologna F.C. 1909 players
Expatriate footballers in Italy
FK Partizan players
FK Smederevo players
FK Teleoptik players
Genoa C.F.C. players
Novara F.C. players
U.S. Salernitana 1919 players
Serbia international footballers
Serbia under-21 international footballers
Serbia youth international footballers
Serbian expatriate footballers
Serbian expatriate sportspeople in Italy
Serbian footballers
Serbian SuperLiga players
Serie A players
Serie B players
Footballers from Belgrade
1988 births
Living people